San Polo is a sestiere (district) of Venice, Italy.

San Polo may also refer to other places in Italy:

San Polo (church), a Catholic church for which the Venice sestiere is named
San Polo, a frazione of Brescia, Lombardy
San Polo (Brescia Metro), a railway station
San Polo, a frazione and municipal seat of Torrile, in the Province of Parma, Emilia-Romagna
San Polo dei Cavalieri, a municipality in the Province of Rome, Lazio
San Polo d'Enza, a municipality in the Province of Reggio Emilia, Emilia-Romagna
San Polo di Piave, a municipality in the Province of Treviso, Veneto
San Polo Matese, a municipality in the Province of Campobasso, Molise

See also

 
 Polo (disambiguation)
 San (disambiguation)